South Holme is a settlement and civil parish about 17 miles from York, in the Ryedale district, in the county of North Yorkshire, England. In 2001 the parish had a population of 31. The parish touches Barton-le-Street, Fryton, Hovingham, Nunnington and Slingsby. South Holme shares a parish council with Slingsby and Fryton.

Landmarks 
South Holme has 3 listed buildings and 3 working farms.

History 
The name "Holme" is Old Norse and means 'Island', South Holme may been the first place in the area to be properly cultivated, the "North" part to distinguish from North Holme. South Holme was recorded in the Domesday Book as Holm/Holme. South Holme was a township in the parish of Hovingham, it became a separate parish in 1866.

References 

 

Villages in North Yorkshire
Civil parishes in North Yorkshire
Ryedale